Émile Nosky-Georges-Henri Emile Daeschner (3 January 1863 Paris - 1928) was a French diplomat.

Biography
He was the son of Ludwig Daeschner (merchant, born in Karlsruhe in 1828, died in Paris in 1878) and Louise Caroline Fernex (1831–1891), he has a law degree and a graduate of the Sciences Po. In 1887, after being admitted to the competition in the diplomatic and consular career, he became attached to the political leadership in the office of Foreign Minister.

From 1888 to 1897, he held various positions in the Foreign Ministry, and in 1898 was appointed second secretary at the embassy in London.
He married Henriette Krug (1876–1929), daughter of Paul Krug (1842–1910) and Caroline Harle 1846–1915), with whom he had four children.

From 1905 to 1906, he was chief of staff and staff of the Prime Minister, Minister of Foreign Affairs. In February 1906, he is member of the French delegation to the funeral of Christian IX of Denmark. From 1906 to 1908 he worked as first secretary of the Embassy of France in Madrid and at the Embassy of France in London.

In 1909, he was appointed Minister Plenipotentiary. In 1912, he was chief of staff and staff of Raymond Poincaré, President of the Council and Minister of Foreign Affairs. From 1913, he was Minister Plenipotentiary 1st class in Lisbon (Portugal) and in Bucharest (Romania) in 1920.
In 1924–1925, he was ambassador of France in Washington, United States.
From 1926 to 1928, he was ambassador of France to Turkey.

References

External links
Raymond Poincaré, Au service de la France : neuf années de souvenirs, 1926

1863 births
1928 deaths
19th-century French diplomats
20th-century French diplomats